Frank Hansen (born August 9, 1952) is an American bobsledder. He competed in the four man event at the 1984 Winter Olympics. Hansen was diagnosed with amyotrophic lateral sclerosis in his 60s.

References

External links
 

1952 births
Living people
American male bobsledders
Olympic bobsledders of the United States
Bobsledders at the 1984 Winter Olympics
Sportspeople from Albany, New York
People with motor neuron disease